Janus (1746–1780) was a Thoroughbred stallion imported to Colonial America. Noted for his quickness and compact conformation, he has subsequently been acknowledged as a foundation sire of the American Quarter Horse.

Background
Bred by Francis Godolphin, 2nd Earl of Godolphin, Janus was foaled in England in 1746.  He was a grandson of the Godolphin Arabian, and like his grandsire, was chestnut in color. Subsequently, owned by Anthony Langley Swymmer, a founding member of the Jockey Club and an English MP. He raced under various names including Little Janus and Stiff Dick. His English racing career took place between 1750 and 1752. Janus won twice at 4 miles and was retired due to injury. Janus was sold to George Grisewood, a horse breeder and turf enthusiast.

Life in America
After becoming lame, Janus was imported to Virginia Colony by Mordecai Booth in 1752, and resold to Mildred Willis.

Janus was able to fully recover and went on to race again. He won races in Virginia and North Carolina.

In late 1771 or early 1772 he was sold to Jeptha Atherton and was moved to North Carolina. In 1773 he was at stud at what would later become Northampton Courthouse, in Jackson, North Carolina. 

Janus died in 1780, aged 34. His offspring included Celer, foaled in 1774, and Spadille.

Manly Wade Wellman wrote a fictionalized account of the life of Janus.

References

Janus
 
Individual American Quarter Horses
Thoroughbred racehorses